Suzanna "Suze" Groeneweg (born 4 March 1875 in Strijensas – died 19 October 1940 in Barendrecht) was a Dutch politician (Social Democratic Workers' Party – SDAP). She was the first woman to be elected into the Dutch parliament.

Groeneweg was a teacher in Rotterdam. She was active in the work for people's education, and also for gender equality, although she did not participate in separate women's groups but preferred to work from within the party. She was also active within the temperance union and the pacifist movement.

Groeneweg was a member of the central committee of the social democratic party, SDAP, in 1917, when partial woman suffrage was introduced: women could be voted into office, but not vote themselves. In 1918, when the first elections after women's suffrage was held, she was elected to parliament as the first woman and sat in the chamber alongside 99 men.

As of 1 January 1920, women in the Netherlands got the right to actively vote as well (which right they could first use at the 1922 elections). Suze Groeneweg was re-elected the same year, and six other women joined her in the house of representatives.

Groeneweg stayed member of the House of Representatives of the Netherlands until June 1937. She was also member of the municipal council of Rotterdam between 1919 and 1931, and the States-Provincial of South Holland between 1919 and 1937.

Decorations 
 In 1937 she was awarded Knight of the Order of the Netherlands Lion.

See also
List of peace activists

References 

  Parlement.com biography

1875 births
1940 deaths
Dutch feminists
Dutch pacifists
Pacifist feminists
20th-century Dutch women politicians
20th-century Dutch politicians
Knights of the Order of the Netherlands Lion
Members of the House of Representatives (Netherlands)
Members of the Provincial Council of South Holland
Municipal councillors of Rotterdam
Dutch members of the Dutch Reformed Church
People from Strijen
Social Democratic Workers' Party (Netherlands) politicians
Dutch socialist feminists